Presidential elections were held in the Comoros on 22 October 1978 following the approval of a new constitution in a referendum earlier in the month. The only candidate was Ahmed Abdallah, who had been President at the time of independence, before being ousted in a coup on 2 August 1975, then reinstated following another on 13 May 1978, since which he had held the post of "Co-Chairman of the Politico-Military Directorate of the Federal and Islamic Republic of Comoros" alongside Mohamed Ahmed. He was elected unopposed.

Results

References

Single-candidate elections
Non-partisan elections
Presidential elections in the Comoros
Presidential election
Comoros
Comoros